The Jammu and Kashmir Pradesh Congress Committee (or J&K PCC) is a state unit of the Indian National Congress (INC) in the state of Jammu and Kashmir

Jammu and Kashmir Legislative Assembly Election

Structure and Composition

See also
 Indian National Congress
 Congress Working Committee
 All India Congress Committee
 Pradesh Congress Committee

References

Jammu and Kashmir
Political parties in Jammu and Kashmir